The Chengdu–Dujiangyan intercity railway is a dual-track, electrified, passenger-dedicated, higher-speed rail line in Sichuan Province, connecting the provincial capital, Chengdu with the satellite city of Dujiangyan. The line was built in 18 months and entered into operation on May 12, 2010. The railway is built to withstand an 8.0-magnitude earthquake.

Route
The railway runs from Chengdu railway station to Dujiangyan's Qingchengshan railway station and passes through Pidu District. Bridges and tunnels account for 67.8% of the line's total length. The line is built to withstand future earthquakes. Sound insulation panels were installed alongside the railway to reduce train noise near the tracks. Clear panels allow passengers to enjoy rural scenery along this route.
The line shortened rail travel time from Chengdu to Dujiangyan by half, and will bring more tourist traffic to Dujiangyan's World Heritage Sites, the city's ancient irrigation system and Mount Qingcheng, a sacred Daoist mountain.

Trains

The route uses CRH1 trains in eight-car train sets, which can carry 661 passengers.  Each day, 14 pairs of trains are scheduled daily between Chengdu and Qingchengshan Station, and 1 pair of trains are scheduled daily between Chengdu and Dujiangyan Station. 6 pairs start Chengdu Station and head up the Pengzhou Branch.

Stations

Principal Line: Chengdu · Anjing · Xipu East · Xipu · Hongguangzhen · Pixian East · Pixian · Pixian West · Ande · Chongyi (planned) · Juyuan · Dujiangyan · Zhongxing (planned) · Qingchengshan
Pengzhou Branch Line: Pixian West · Xinmin · Sandaoyan · Gucheng · Pengzhou South · Buxingjie · Pengzhou
Lidui Branch Line: Juyuan · Yingbin Road · Libing Square · Lidui Park

Prices

History
On May 28, 2008, 16 days after the Wenchuan earthquake devastated Dujiangyan and the western suburbs of Chengdu, the Chengdu city government and the Ministry of Railways agreed to build a high-speed railway line as part of the reconstruction of the disaster zone. Construction began on November 4, 2008 and involved 20,000 workers at the cost of ¥13 billion.  The line entered trial operation on April 1, 2010 and full commercial operation began on May 12, 2010, the second anniversary of the large earthquake that killed some 70,000 people in the region.

References

External links 
 

Railway lines in China
High-speed railway lines in China
Rail transport in Sichuan
Railway lines opened in 2010